The Scroll of the Dead is a 1998 adventure mystery pastiche novel written by David Stuart Davies, featuring Sherlock Holmes and Dr. John Watson as they investigate a theft from the British Museum with ties to the Black Arts.

Plot
After Holmes and Watson attend a bogus seance to unmask a phony psychic, they are called upon to investigate a murder and the theft of a scroll from the British Museum. As it turns out, this is but the first key towards uncovering a mysterious Egyptian tomb, and within it, a papyrus that may hold the power of eternal life.

Reprints
Titan Books reprinted the book in 2009, under the title of The Further Adventures of Sherlock Holmes: The Scroll of the Dead as part of its Further Adventures series, which collects a number of noted Holmesian pastiches.

See also
 Sherlock Holmes pastiches

External links
The Scroll of the Dead at Titan Books

1998 British novels
England in fiction
Ancient Egypt in popular culture
Ancient Egypt in fiction
Sherlock Holmes pastiches
Sherlock Holmes novels